Neasura hypophaeola is a moth of the subfamily Arctiinae. It was described by George Hampson in 1900. It is found on the Sangihe Islands.

References

 Natural History Museum Lepidoptera generic names catalog

Further reading
 

Lithosiini
Moths described in 1900